Hiromichi Mizuno is a financial executive who served as Chief Investment Officer of the Japan Government Pension Investment Fund (GPIF), the largest asset owner in the world, from January 2015 until March 2020. He is currently United Nations Special Envoy on Innovative Finance and Sustainable Investments.

Early life and education 
Mizuno was born in Tajimi in Gifu Prefecture, Japan.  He received his BA of Law at the Osaka City University, before gaining an Master of Business Administration at the Kellogg School of Management of Northwestern University.

Career 
Earlier in his career, Mizuno worked for Sumitomo Mitsui Trust Holdings from 1988 to 2003. Prior to joining GPIF, he was a partner of Coller Capital from 2003 to 2005.

Mizuno is currently a Director of the United Nations Principles for Responsible Investment Association. On 30 December 2020, he was appointed by United Nations Secretary-General António Guterres as United Nations Special Envoy on Innovative Finance and Sustainable Investments.

Other activities

Corporate boards 
 Tesla, Inc., Independent Member of the Board of Directors (since 2020)
 Danone, Member of the Mission Committee (since 2020)

Non-profit organizations 
 The B Team, Member
 CFA Institute, Member of the Future of Finance Advisory Council
 Global Business Coalition for Education, Member of the Advisory Board

Controversy 
In September 2020, the Financial Times reported that Mizuno had intervened personally to influence the Harvard University endowment fund – one of Toshiba's largest investors – in what it described as "campaign" to ensure the reappointment of Nobuaki Kurumatani as Toshiba chief executive against the opposition of activist shareholders.

References

Further reading

External links
 Hiromichi Mizuno (@hiromichimizuno), on Twitter

Tajimi, Gifu
People from Gifu Prefecture
Investment in Japan
Tesla, Inc. people
Kellogg School of Management alumni
Osaka University alumni
1965 births
Living people
Special Envoys of the Secretary-General of the United Nations